Capparis spinosa, the caper bush, also called Flinders rose, is a perennial plant that bears rounded, fleshy leaves and large white to pinkish-white flowers.

The plant is best known for the edible flower buds (capers), used as a seasoning or garnish, and the fruit (caper berries), both of which are usually consumed salted or pickled. Other species of Capparis are also picked along with C. spinosa for their buds or fruits. Other parts of Capparis plants are used in the manufacture of medicines and cosmetics.

Capparis spinosa is native to almost all the circum-Mediterranean countries, and is included in the flora of most of them, but whether it is indigenous to this region is uncertain. The family Capparaceae could have originated in the tropics and later spread to the Mediterranean basin.

The taxonomic status of the species is controversial and unsettled. Species within the genus Capparis are highly variable, and interspecific hybrids have been common throughout the evolutionary history of the genus. As a result, some authors have considered C. spinosa to be composed of multiple distinct species, others that the taxon is a single species with multiple varieties or subspecies, or that the taxon C. spinosa is a hybrid between C. orientalis and C. sicula.

Plant 

The shrubby plant is many-branched, with alternate leaves, thick and shiny, round to ovate. The flowers are complete, sweetly fragrant, and showy, with four sepals and four white to pinkish-white petals, many long violet-coloured stamens, and a single stigma usually rising well above the stamens.

Range
Capparis spinosa ranges around the Mediterranean Basin, Arabian Peninsula, and portions of Western and Central Asia.

In southern Europe it is found in southern Portugal, southern and eastern Spain including the Balearic Islands, Mediterranean France including Corsica, Italy including Sicily and Sardinia, Croatia's Dalmatian islands, Albania, Greece and the Greek Islands, western and southern Turkey, on Cyprus, and on the Crimean Peninsula in Ukraine. In Spain it ranges from sea level up to 1300 meters elevation.

In northern Africa it is found throughout the north and the Atlas Mountains of Morocco, where it occurs from sea level up to 2000 meters elevation. It is also found in northern Algeria (Kabylie, coastal Algeria, Bouzaréa, and Oran) and the Hoggar Mountains of the Algerian Sahara, in Tunisia north of the Sahara, and Cyrenaica in Libya.

In western Asia it is found along the eastern Mediterranean in Lebanon, Israel, Palestine, Syria, and western Jordan, and in the southern Sinai Peninsula of Egypt. It is also found south of the Caucasus in Armenia, Azerbaijan, Georgia, and northeastern Turkey. On the Arabian Peninsula it occurs in Oman, Yemen including Socotra, and Asir province of Saudi Arabia. In central Asia it inhabits the mountains of central Afghanistan, the lower Karakoram range in northern Pakistan and Ladakh, and Tajikistan, Kyrgyzstan, and eastern Uzbekistan.

Environmental requirements 

The caper bush requires a semiarid or arid climate. The caper bush has developed a series of mechanisms that reduce the impact of high radiation levels, high daily temperature, and insufficient soil water during its growing period.

The caper bush has a curious reaction to sudden increases in humidity; it forms wart-like pockmarks across the leaf surface. This is harmless, as the plant quickly adjusts to the new conditions and produces unaffected leaves.

It also shows characteristics of a plant adapted to poor soils. This shrub has a high root/shoot ratio and the presence of mycorrhizae serves to maximize the uptake of minerals in poor soils. Different nitrogen-fixing bacterial strains have been isolated from the caper bush rhizosphere, playing a role in maintaining high reserves of that growth-limiting element.

Cultivation 

The caper bush has been introduced as a specialized culture in some European countries in the last four decades. The economic importance of the caper plant led to a significant increase in the area under cultivation and production levels during the late 1980s. The main production areas are in harsh environments found in Iraq, Morocco, the southeastern Iberian Peninsula, Turkey, the Greek island of Santorini, and the Italian island of Pantelleria, and the Aeolian Islands, especially Salina. Capers from Pantelleria and Aelian island are recognized as European PGI products. This species has developed special mechanisms to survive in Mediterranean conditions, and introduction in semiarid lands may help to prevent the disruption of the equilibrium of those fragile ecosystems.

A harvest duration of at least three months is necessary for profitability. Intense daylight and a long growing period are necessary to secure high yields. The caper bush can withstand temperatures over 40 °C in summer, but it is sensitive to frost during its vegetative period. A caper bush can survive low temperatures in the form of a stump, as happens in the foothills of the Alps. Caper plants are found even 3,500 m above sea level in Ladakh, though they are usually grown at lower altitudes. Some Italian and Argentine plantings can withstand strong winds without problems due to the plant's decumbent architecture and the coriaceous consistency of the leaves in some populations.

The known distributions of each species can be used to identify the origin of commercially prepared capers.

The caper bush is a rupicolous species. It is widespread in rocky areas and is grown on different soil associations, including alfisols, regosols, and lithosols. In other Himalayan locations, C. spinosa tolerates silty clay and sandy, rocky, or gravelly surface soils, with less than 1% organic matter. It grows on bare rocks, crevices, cracks, and dunes in Pakistan, in dry calcareous escarpments of the Adriatic region, in dry coastal ecosystems of Egypt, Libya, and Tunisia, in transitional zones between the littoral salt marsh and the coastal deserts of the Asian Red Sea coast, in the rocky arid bottoms of the Jordan valley, in calcareous sandstone cliffs at Ramat Aviv, Israel, and in the central west and northwest coastal dunes of Australia. It grows spontaneously in wall joints of antique Roman fortresses, on the Western Wall of Jerusalem's Temple Mount, and on the ramparts of the castle of Santa Bárbara (Alicante, Spain). Clinging caper plants are dominant on the medieval limestone-made ramparts of Alcudia and the bastions of Palma (Majorca, Spain). This aggressive pioneering has brought about serious problems for the protection of monuments.

Propagation 

Capers can be grown easily from fresh seeds gathered from ripe fruit and planted into a well-drained seed-raising mix. Seedlings appear in two to four weeks. Old, stored seeds enter a state of dormancy and require cold stratification to germinate. The viable embryos germinate within three to four days after partial removal of the lignified seed coats. The seed coats and the mucilage surrounding the seeds may be ecological adaptations to avoid water loss and conserve seed viability during the dry season.

Use of stem cuttings avoids high variability in terms of production and quality. Nevertheless, plants grown from cuttings are more susceptible to drought during the first years after planting. The caper bush is a difficult-to-root woody species, and successful propagation requires careful consideration of biotypes and seasonal and environmental parameters. Rootings up to 55% are possible when using one-year-old wood, depending on cutting harvest time and substrate used. Propagation from stem cuttings is the standard method for growing ‘Mallorquina’ and ‘Italiana’ in Spain and ‘Nocella’ in the Aeolian Islands, esp. Salina. Hardwood cuttings vary in length from 15 to 50 cm, and the diameter of the cuttings may range from 1.0 to 2.5 cm. Another possibility is to collect stems during February through the beginning of March, treat them with captan or captafol and stratify them outdoors or in a chamber at 3–4 °C, covered with sand or plastic. Moisture content and drainage should be carefully monitored and maintained until planting. Using semi-hardwood cuttings collected and planted during August and September, low survival rates (under 30%) have been achieved. Softwood cuttings are prepared in April from 25- to 30-day shoots. Each cutting should contain at least two nodes and be six to 10 cm long. Basal or subterminal cuttings are more successful than terminal ones. Then, cuttings are planted in a greenhouse under a mist system with bottom heat; 150 to 200 cuttings/m2 may be planted.

Orchard establishment 
A rainy spring and a hot, dry summer are considered advantageous. This drought-tolerant perennial plant is used for landscaping and reducing erosion along highways, steep rocky slopes, dunes or fragile semiarid ecosystems.

Caper plantings over 25 to 30 years old are still productive. Thus, physical properties of the soil (texture and depth) are particularly important. Caper bushes can develop extensive root systems and grow best on deep, non-stratified, medium-textured, loamy soils. Mouldboard plowing and harrowing are usual practices before caper plant establishment. Soil-profile modification practices, such as deep plowing operating 0.6 to 1 m, can ameliorate some restrictions. In Pantelleria, digging backhoe pits for each shrub was found to be the most effective means of cultivating caper in rocky soils. Two planting designs are used, the square/rectangle and the hedgerow system. Spacing is determined by the vigour of the biotype, soil fertility, equipment used and the irrigation method, if any.

Harvest 
Caper buds are usually picked in the morning. Because the youngest, smallest buds fetch the highest prices, daily picking is typical.

Capers may be harvested from wild plants, in which case it is necessary to know that the plant is not one of the few poisonous Capparis species that look similar. The plant normally has curved thorns that may scratch the people who harvest the buds, although a few spineless varieties have been developed.

Culinary uses 

The salted and pickled caper bud (called simply a caper) is used as an ingredient, seasoning, or garnish. Capers are a common ingredient in Mediterranean cuisine, especially Cypriot, Italian, Aeolian Greek, and Maltese food. The immature fruit of the caper shrub are prepared similarly and marketed as caper berries. Fully mature fruit are not preferred, as they contain many hard seeds.

The buds, when ready to pick, are a dark olive green and range in size from under 7 mm to more than 14 mm. They are picked, then pickled in salt or a salt and vinegar solution, and drained. Intense flavour, sometimes described as being similar to black pepper or mustard, is developed as glucocapparin, a glycoside organosulfur molecule, is released from each caper bud. This enzymatic reaction leads to the formation of rutin, often seen as crystallized white spots on the surfaces of individual caper buds.

Capers are a distinctive ingredient in Italian cuisine, especially in Sicilian,  Aeolian, and southern Italian cooking. They are commonly used in salads, pasta salads, meat dishes, and pasta sauces. Examples of uses in Italian cuisine are chicken piccata and spaghetti alla puttanesca.

Capers are an ingredient in tartar sauce. They are often served with cold smoked salmon or cured salmon dishes, especially lox and cream cheese. Capers and caper berries are sometimes substituted for olives to garnish a martini.

Capers are categorized and sold by their size, defined as follows, with the smallest sizes being the most desirable: non-pareil (up to 7 mm), surfines (7–8 mm), capucines (8–9 mm), capotes (9–11 mm), fines (11–13 mm), and grusas (14+ mm). If the caper bud is not picked, it flowers and produces a caper berry. The fruit can be pickled and then served as a Greek mezze.

Caper leaves, which are hard to find outside of Greece or Cyprus, are used particularly in salads and fish dishes. They are pickled or boiled and preserved in jars with brine—like caper buds.

Dried caper leaves are also used as a substitute for rennet in manufacturing high-quality cheese.

Nutrition 

Canned, pickled capers are 84% water, 5% carbohydrates, 2% protein, and 1% fat (table). Preserved capers are particularly high in sodium due to the amount of salt added to the brine. In a typical serving of 28 grams (one ounce), capers supply 6 kcal and 35% of the Daily Value (DV) for sodium, with no other nutrients in significant content. In a 100-gram amount, the sodium content is 2960 mg or 197% DV, with vitamin K (23% DV), iron (13% DV), and riboflavin (12% DV) also having appreciable levels (table).

Polyphenols 

Canned capers contain polyphenols, including the flavonoids quercetin (173 mg per 100 g) and kaempferol (131 mg per 100 g), as well as anthocyanins.

Other uses 
Capers are sometimes used in cosmetics.

History 
The caper was used in ancient Greece as a carminative. It is represented in archaeological levels in the form of carbonised seeds and rarely as flower buds and fruits from archaic and Classical antiquity contexts. Athenaeus in Deipnosophistae pays a lot of attention to the caper, as do Pliny (NH XIX, XLVIII.163) and Theophrastus.

Etymologically, the caper and its relatives in several European languages can be traced back to Classical Latin capparis, “caper”, in turn, borrowed from the Greek κάππαρις, kápparis, whose origin (as that of the plant) is unknown but is probably Asian. Another theory links kápparis to the name of the island of Cyprus (Κύπρος, Kýpros), where capers grow abundantly.

In Biblical times, the caper berry was supposed to have aphrodisiac properties; the Hebrew word aviyyonah (אֲבִיּוֹנָה) for caperberry is closely linked to the Hebrew root אבה (avah), meaning "desire". The word occurs once in the Bible, in the book of Ecclesiastes, at verse .

The King James Version translates based on the Hebrew root (and perhaps the metaphorical meaning):...the grasshopper shall be a burden, and desire shall fail.  ( KJV)

The medieval Jewish commentator Rashi also gives a similar gloss ( ME).  However, ancient translations, including the Septuagint, Vulgate, Peshitta and Aquila, render the word more concretely as κάππαρις, "caper berry". Thus in the words of one modern idiomatic translation (2004),...the grasshopper loses its spring,  and the caper berry has no effect;  ( HCSB)

Of other modern versions, the New International Version (NIV) uses "desire" ( NIV), while the New American Standard Bible (NASB) has "caper-berry" ( NASB), as did the 1917 Jewish Publication Society version.

The berries (abiyyonot) were eaten, as appears from their liability to tithes and the restrictions of the 'Orlah.  They are carefully distinguished in the Mishnah and the Talmud from the caper leaves, alin, shoots, temarot, and the caper buds, capperisin (note the similarity "caper"isin to "caper"); all of which were eaten as seen from the blessing requirement, and declared to be the fruit of the ẓelaf or caper plant.
The "capperisin" mentioned in the Talmud are actually referring to a shell that protected the "abiyyonot" as it grew.

Talmud Bavli discusses the eating of caper sepals versus caper berries, both inside the land of Israel, outside the land of Israel, and in Syria.

Capers are mentioned as a spice in the Roman cookbook, Apicius.

Alternatives 
Nasturtium, marigold, and Cassia buds have sometimes been used as a substitute.

Gallery

References

External links 

 
 
 Caper factsheetNewCROP, Purdue University
 Book. "Capers. From Wild Harvest to Gourmet Food". Brian Noone 2017 Published by Caperplants.
 Caperplants

Capparis
Edible plants
Flora of Australia
Flora of Europe
Flora of North Africa
Flora of temperate Asia
Australian Aboriginal bushcraft
Bushfood
Medicinal plants of Africa
Medicinal plants of Asia
Medicinal plants of Oceania
Indian spices
Pickles
Spices
Garden plants of Asia
Garden plants of Europe